Mishaal Al Saud can refer to number of members of Saudi royal family:
Mishaal bin Abdulaziz Al Saud (1926–2017)
Mishaal bin Abdullah Al Saud (born 1970)
Mishaal bin Saud al-Rashid Al Saud (born 1918)
Mishaal bin Saud Al Saud (born 1940)